The Regency era of British history officially spanned the years 1811 to 1820, though the term is commonly applied to the longer period between  and 1837. King George III succumbed to mental illness in late 1810 and, by the Regency Act 1811, his eldest son George, Prince of Wales, was appointed prince regent to discharge royal functions. When George III died in 1820, the Prince Regent succeeded him as George IV. In terms of periodisation, the longer timespan is roughly the final third of the Georgian era (1714–1837), encompassing the last 25 years or so of George III's reign, including the official Regency, and the complete reigns of both George IV and his brother William IV. It ends with the accession of Queen Victoria in June 1837 and is followed by the Victorian era (1837–1901).

Although the Regency era is remembered as a time of refinement and culture, that was the preserve of the wealthy few, especially those in the Prince Regent's own social circle. For the masses, poverty was rampant as population began to concentrate due to industrial labour migration. City dwellers lived in increasingly larger slums, a state of affairs severely aggravated by the combined impact of war, economic collapse, mass unemployment, a bad harvest in 1816 (the "Year Without a Summer"), and an ongoing population boom. Political response to the crisis included the Corn Laws, the Peterloo Massacre, and the Representation of the People Act 1832. Led by William Wilberforce, there was increasing support for the abolitionist cause during the Regency era, culminating in passage of the Slave Trade Act 1807 and the Slavery Abolition Act 1833.

The longer timespan recognises the wider social and cultural aspects of the Regency era, characterised by the distinctive fashions, architecture, and style of the period. The first 20 years to 1815 were overshadowed by the Napoleonic Wars. Throughout the whole period, the Industrial Revolution gathered pace and achieved significant progress by the coming of the railways and the growth of the factory system. The Regency era overlapped with Romanticism and many of the major artists, musicians, novelists, and poets of the Romantic movement were prominent Regency figures such as Jane Austen, William Blake, Lord Byron, John Constable, John Keats, John Nash, Ann Radcliffe, Walter Scott, Mary Shelley, Percy Bysshe Shelley, J. M. W. Turner, and William Wordsworth.

Legislative background 

George III (1738–1820) became King of Great Britain on 25 October 1760 when he was 22 years old, succeeding his grandfather George II. George III had himself been the subject of legislation to provide for a regency when Parliament passed the Minority of Successor to Crown Act 1751 following the death of his father Frederick, Prince of Wales, on 31 March 1751. George became heir apparent at the age of 12 and he would have succeeded as a minor if his grandfather had died before 4 June 1756, George's 18th birthday. As a contingency, the Act provided for his mother, Augusta, Dowager Princess of Wales, to be appointed regent and discharge most but not all royal functions.

In 1761, George III married Princess Charlotte of Mecklenburg-Strelitz and they had 15 children (nine sons and six daughters). The eldest was Prince George, born on 12 August 1762 as heir apparent. He was named Prince of Wales soon after his birth. By 1765, three infant children led the order of succession and Parliament again passed a Regency Act as contingency. The Minority of Heir to the Crown Act 1765 provided for either Queen Charlotte or Princess Augusta to act as regent if necessary. George III had a long episode of mental illness in the summer of 1788. Parliament proposed the Regency Bill 1789 which was passed by the House of Commons. Before the House of Lords could debate it, the King recovered and the Bill was withdrawn. Had it been passed into law, the Prince of Wales would have become the regent in 1789.

The King's mental health continued to be a matter of concern but, whenever he was of sound mind, he opposed any further moves to implement a Regency Act. Finally, following the death on 2 November 1810 of his youngest daughter, Princess Amelia, he became permanently insane. Parliament passed the Care of King During his Illness, etc. Act 1811, commonly known as the Regency Act 1811. The King was suspended from his duties as head of state and the Prince of Wales assumed office as Prince Regent on 5 February 1811. At first, Parliament restricted some of the Regent's powers, but the constraints expired one year after the passage of the Act. The Regency ended when George III died on 29 January 1820 and the Prince Regent succeeded him as George IV.

After George IV died in 1830, a further Regency Act was passed by Parliament. George IV was succeeded by his brother William IV. His wife, Queen Adelaide, was 37 and there were no surviving legitimate children. The heir presumptive was Princess Victoria of Kent, aged eleven. The new Act provided for her mother, Victoria, Duchess of Kent to become regent in the event of William's death before 24 May 1837, the young Victoria's 18th birthday. The Act made allowance for Adelaide having another child, either before or after William's death. If the latter scenario had arisen, Victoria would have become Queen only temporarily until the new monarch was born. Adelaide had no more children and, as it happened, William died on 20 June 1837, just four weeks after Victoria was 18.

Perceptions

Periodisation terminology 

Officially, the Regency began on 5 February 1811 and ended on 29 January 1820 but the "Regency Era", as such, is generally perceived to have been much longer. The term is commonly, though loosely, applied to the period from  until the accession of Queen Victoria on 20 June 1837. The Regency Era is a sub-period of the longer Georgian Era (1714–1837), both of which were followed by the Victorian Era (1837–1901). The latter term had contemporaneous usage although some historians give it an earlier startpoint, typically the enactment of the Great Reform Act on 7 June 1832.

Social, economic and political counterpoints 

The Prince Regent himself was one of the leading patrons of the arts and architecture. He ordered the costly building and refurbishing of the exotic Brighton Pavilion, the ornate Carlton House, and many other public works and architecture. This all required considerable expense which neither the Regent himself nor HM Treasury could afford. The Regent's extravagance was pursued at the expense of the common people.

While the Regency is noted for its elegance and achievements in the fine arts and architecture, there was a concurrent need for social, political and economic change. The country was enveloped in the Napoleonic Wars until June 1815 and the conflict heavily impacted commerce at home and internationally. There was mass unemployment and, in 1816, an exceptionally bad harvest. In addition, the country underwent a population boom and the combination of these factors resulted in rampant poverty. Apart from the national unity government led by William Grenville from February 1806 to March 1807, all governments from December 1783 to November 1830 were formed and led by Tories. Their responses to the national crisis included the Peterloo Massacre in 1819 and the various Corn Laws. The Whig government of Earl Grey passed the Great Reform Act in 1832.

Essentially, England during the Regency era was a stratified society in which political power and influence lay in the hands of the landed class. Their fashionable locales were worlds apart from the slums in which the majority of people existed. The slum districts were known as rookeries, a notorious example being St Giles in London. These were places where alcoholism, gambling, prostitution, thievery and violence prevailed. The population boom, comprising an increase from just under a million in 1801 to one and a quarter million by 1820, heightened the crisis. Robert Southey drew a comparison between the squalor of the slums and the glamour of the Regent's circle:

The squalor that existed beneath the glamour and gloss of Regency society provided sharp contrast to the Prince Regent's social circle. Poverty was addressed only marginally. The formation of the Regency after the retirement of George III saw the end of a more pious and reserved society, and gave birth of a more frivolous, ostentatious one. This change was influenced by the Regent himself, who was kept entirely removed from the machinations of politics and military exploits. This did nothing to channel his energies in a more positive direction, thereby leaving him with the pursuit of pleasure as his only outlet, as well as his sole form of rebellion against what he saw as disapproval and censure in the form of his father.

The arts

Architecture

Regent's Park and London Zoo 

In the 1810s, the Prince Regent proposed the conversion of crown land in Marylebone and St Pancras into a pleasure garden. The design work was initially assigned to the architect John Nash but it was the father and son partnership of James and Decimus Burton who had the majority of input to the project. Landscaping continued through the 1820s and Regent's Park was finally opened to the public in 1841.

The Zoological Society of London (ZSL) was founded in 1826 by Sir Stamford Raffles and Sir Humphry Davy. They obtained land alongside the route of the Regent's Canal through the northern perimeter of Regent's Park, between the City of Westminster and the London Borough of Camden. Following the death of Raffles soon afterwards, the 3rd Marquess of Lansdowne assumed responsibility for the project and supervised construction of the first animal houses. At first, the zoo was used for scientific purposes only with admittance restricted to Fellows of the ZSL which, in 1829, was granted a Royal charter by George IV. The zoo was not opened to the public until 1847, after it became necessary to raise funds.

Literature 

Jane Austen, Lord Byron and others were the most prominent writers of the Regency era.

Music 

Wealthy households staged their own music events by relying on family members who could sing or play an instrument. For the vast majority of people, street performers provided their sole access to music of any kind.

Painting 

The most prominent painters were John Constable and J. M. W. Turner.

Theatre 

The plays of William Shakespeare were very popular throughout the period. The performers wore modern dress, however, rather than 16th century costumes.

Media 

Among the popular newspapers, pamphlets and other publications of the era were:

 Ackermann's Repository
 The Gentleman's Magazine
 The Times
 The Observer
 Cobbett's Weekly Political Register
 La Belle Assemblée

Science and technology 

In 1814, The Times adopted steam printing. Using this method, it could print 1,100 sheets every hour, five and a half times the prior rate of 200 per hour. The faster speed of printing enabled the rise of the "silver fork novels" which depicted the lives of the rich and aristocratic. Publishers used these as a way of spreading gossip and scandal, often clearly hinting at identities. The novels were popular during the later years of the Regency era.

Sport and recreation

Women's activities 

During the Regency era and well into the succeeding Victorian era, society women were discouraged from exertion although many did take the opportunity to pursue activities such as dancing, riding and walking that were recreational rather than competitive. In Pride and Prejudice, the Bennet sisters are frequently out walking and it is at a ball where Elizabeth meets Mr Darcy. There was a contemporary belief that people had limited energy levels with women, as the "weaker sex", being most at risk of over-exertion because their menstruation cycles caused periodic energy reductions.

Bare-knuckle boxing 

Bare-knuckle boxing, also known as prizefighting, was a popular sport through the 18th and 19th centuries. The Regency era has been called "the peak of British boxing" because the champion fighter in Britain was also, in effect, the world champion. Britain's only potential rival was the United States, where organised boxing began . Boxing was in fact illegal but local authorities, who were often involved on the gambling side of the sport, would turn a blind eye. In any case, the huge crowds that attended championship bouts were almost impossible to police. Like cricket and horse racing, boxing attracted gamblers. The sport needed the investment provided by gambling, but there was a seamier side in that many fights were fixed.

At one time, prizefighting was "anything goes" but the champion boxer Jack Broughton proposed a set of rules in 1743 that were observed throughout the Regency era until they were superseded by the London Prize Ring Rules in 1838. Broughton's rules were a reaction to "bar room brawling" as they restricted fighters to use of the fists only. A round ended when a fighter was grounded and the rules prohibited the hitting of a downed opponent. He was helped to his corner and then had thirty seconds in which to "step up to the mark", which was a line drawn for that purpose so that the fighters squared off less than a yard apart. The next round would then begin. A fighter who failed to step up and square off was declared the loser. Contests continued until one fighter could not step up.

There were no weight divisions and so a heavyweight always had a natural advantage over smaller fighters. Even so, the first British champion of the Regency era was Daniel Mendoza, a middleweight who had successfully claimed the vacant title in 1792. He held it until he was defeated by the heavyweight Gentleman John Jackson in April 1795. Other Regency era champions were famous fighters like Jem Belcher, Hen Pearce, John Gully, Tom Cribb, Tom Spring, Jem Ward and James Burke. Gully went on to become a successful racehorse owner and, representing the Pontefract constituency, a Member of the first post-Reform Parliament from December 1832 to July 1837. Cribb was the first fighter to be acclaimed world champion after he twice defeated the American Tom Molineaux in 1811.

Cricket 

Marylebone Cricket Club, widely known as MCC, was founded in 1787 and became cricket's governing body. In 1788, the club drafted and published a revised version of the sport's rules. MCC had considerable influence throughout the Regency era and its ground, Lord's, became cricket's premier venue. There were in fact three Lord's grounds. The first, opened in 1787 when the club was formed, was on the site of Dorset Square in Marylebone, hence the name of the club. The lease was terminated in 1811 because of a rental dispute and the club took temporary lease of a second ground in St John's Wood. This was in use for only three seasons until the land was requisitioned because it was on the proposed route of the Regent's Canal. MCC moved to a nearby site on which they established their present ground.

Lord Byron played for Harrow School in the first Eton v Harrow match at Lord's in 1805. The match became an annual event in the social calendar.

Lord's staged the first Gentlemen v Players match in 1806. This fixture provides another illustration of the class divide in Regency society as it matched a team of well-to-do amateurs (Gentlemen) against a team of working-class professionals (Players). The first match featured Billy Beldham and William Lambert, who have been recognised as the outstanding professionals of the period, and Lord Frederick Beauclerk as the outstanding amateur player. The 1821 match ended prematurely after the Gentlemen team, well behind in the contest, conceded defeat. This had been billed as the "Coronation Match" because it celebrated the accession of the Prince Regent as King George IV and the outcome was described by the sports historian Sir Derek Birley as "a suitably murky affair".

Football 

Football in Great Britain had long been a no-holds-barred pastime with an unlimited number of players on opposing teams which might comprise whole parishes or villages. The playing area was an undefined stretch of land between the two places. The ball, as such, was often a pig's bladder that had been inflated and the object of the exercise was to move the ball by any means possible to a distant target such as a church in the opposing village. The contests were typically arranged to take place on feast days like Shrove Tuesday. By the beginning of the 19th century, efforts were being made in the English public schools to transform this mob football into an organised team sport. The earliest known versions of football code rules were written at Eton College (1815) and Aldenham School (1825).

Horse racing 

Horse racing had been very popular since the years after the Restoration when Charles II was a frequent visitor to Newmarket Racecourse. In the Regency era, the five classic races had all been inaugurated and have been run annually since 1814. These races are the St Leger Stakes (first run in 1776), The Oaks (1779), the Epsom Derby (1780), the 2,000 Guineas Stakes (1809) and the 1,000 Guineas Stakes (1814).

National Hunt racing began in 18th century Ireland and developed in England through the Regency era. There are tentative references to races held between 1792 and 1810. The first definitely recorded hurdle race took place on Durdham Down, near Bristol, in 1821. The first officially recognised steeplechase was over a cross-country route in Bedfordshire on 8 March 1830.

Aintree Racecourse held its first meeting on 7 July 1829. On 29 February 1836, a race called the Grand Liverpool Steeplechase was held. One of its organisers was Captain Martin Becher who rode The Duke to victory. The infamous sixth fence at Aintree is called Becher's Brook. The 1836 race, which became an annual event, is recognised by some as the first Grand National, but there are historical uncertainties about the three races between 1836 and 1838 so they are officially regarded as precursors to the Grand National. Some sources insist they were held on Old Racecourse Farm in nearby Maghull but this is impossible as that course closed in 1835. The first official Grand National was the 1839 race.

Rowing and sailing 

Rowing and sailing had become popular pastimes among the wealthier citizens. The Boat Race, a rowing event between the Cambridge University Boat Club and the Oxford University Boat Club, was first held in 1829 at the instigation of Charles Merivale and Charles Wordsworth, who were students at Cambridge and Oxford respectively. Wordsworth was a nephew of William Wordsworth. The first race was at Henley-on-Thames and the contest later became an annual event on the River Thames in London. In sailing, the first Cowes Week regatta was held on the Solent in August 1826.

Track and field athletics 

Track and field competitions in the modern sense were first recorded in the early 19th century. They are known to have been held by schools, colleges, army and navy bases, social clubs and the like, often as a challenge to a rival establishment. In the public schools, athletics competitions were conceived as human equivalents of horse racing or fox hunting with runners known as "hounds" and named as if they were racehorses. The Royal Shrewsbury School Hunt, established in 1819, is the world's oldest running club. The school organised paper chase races in which the hounds followed a trail of paper shreds left by two "foxes". The oldest running race of the modern era is Shrewsbury's Annual Steeplechase (cross-country), first definitely recorded in 1834.

Events 

 1811George Augustus Frederick, Prince of Wales, began his nine-year tenure as regent and became known as The Prince Regent. This sub-period of the Georgian era began the formal Regency. The Duke of Wellington held off the French at Fuentes de Oñoro and Albuhera in the Peninsular War. The Prince Regent held a fête at 9:00 p.m. 19 June 1811, at Carlton House in celebration of his assumption of the Regency. Luddite uprisings. Glasgow weavers riot.
 1812 Prime Minister Spencer Perceval was assassinated in the House of Commons. The final shipment of the Elgin Marbles arrived in England. Sarah Siddons retired from the stage. Shipping and territory disputes started the War of 1812 between the United Kingdom and the United States. The British were victorious over French armies at the Battle of Salamanca. Gas company (Gas Light and Coke Company) founded. Charles Dickens, English writer and social critic of the Victorian era, was born on 7 February 1812.
 1813 Pride and Prejudice by Jane Austen was published. William Hedley's Puffing Billy, an early steam locomotive, ran on smooth rails. Quaker prison reformer Elizabeth Fry started her ministry at Newgate Prison. Robert Southey became Poet Laureate.
 1814 Invasion of France by allies led to the Treaty of Paris, ended one of the Napoleonic Wars. Napoleon abdicated and was exiled to Elba. The Duke of Wellington was honoured at Burlington House in London. British soldiers burn the White House. Last River Thames Frost Fair was held, which was the last time the river froze. Gas lighting introduced in London streets.
 1815Napoleon I of France defeated by the Seventh Coalition at the Battle of Waterloo. Napoleon was exiled to St. Helena. The English Corn Laws restricted corn imports. Sir Humphry Davy patented the miners' safety lamp. John Loudon Macadam's road construction method adopted.
 1816 Income tax abolished. A "year without a summer" followed a volcanic eruption in Indonesia. Mary Shelley wrote Frankenstein. William Cobbett published his newspaper as a pamphlet. The British returned Indonesia to the Dutch. Regent's Canal, London, phase one of construction. Beau Brummell escaped his creditors by fleeing to France.
 1817 Antonin Carême created a spectacular feast for the Prince Regent at the Royal Pavilion in Brighton. The death of Princess Charlotte, the Prince Regent's daughter, from complications of childbirth changed obstetrical practices. Elgin Marbles shown at the British Museum. Captain Bligh died.
 1818 Queen Charlotte died at Kew. Manchester cotton spinners went on strike. Riot in Stanhope, County Durham between lead miners and the Bishop of Durham's men over Weardale game rights. Piccadilly Circus constructed in London. Frankenstein published. Emily Brontë born.
 1819Peterloo Massacre. Princess Alexandrina Victoria (future Queen Victoria) was christened in Kensington Palace. Ivanhoe by Walter Scott was published. Sir Stamford Raffles, a British administrator, founded Singapore. First steam-propelled vessel (the SS Savannah) crossed the Atlantic and arrived in Liverpool from Savannah, Georgia.
 1820 Death of George III and the accession of The Prince Regent as George IV. The House of Lords passed a bill to grant George IV a divorce from Queen Caroline, but because of public pressure, the bill was dropped. John Constable began work on The Hay Wain. Cato Street Conspiracy failed. Royal Astronomical Society founded. Venus de Milo discovered.

Places 

The following is a list of places associated with the Regency era:

 The Adelphi Theatre
 Almack's
 Angelo's, a fencing parlor
 Astley's Amphitheatre
  Attingham Park

 Bath, Somerset
 Bond Street
 Brighton Pavilion
 Brighton and Hove
 Brooks's
 Burlington Arcade
 Bury St Edmunds
 Carlton House, London
 Chapel Royal, St. James's
 Cheltenham, Gloucestershire
 Circulating libraries, 1801–25

 Covent Garden
 Custom Office, London Docks
 Doncaster Races

 Drury Lane
 Floris of London
 Fortnum & Mason
 Gretna Green

 Gentleman Jackson's Saloon, a pugilist's parlor by bare-knuckle champion John Jackson
 Hatchard's
 Little Theatre, Haymarket
 Her Majesty's Theatre
 Holland House
 Houses of Parliament
 Hyde Park, London
 Jermyn Street
 Kensington Gardens
 King of Clubs (Whig club)
 List of gentlemen's clubs in London
 Lloyd's of London
 London Dock
 London Institution
 London Post Office
 Lyme Regis
 Marshalsea, closed in 1811, new site opened in 1811 where White Lion Prison had been.  Primarily a debtors' prison, also housed seditionists and political prisoners
 Mayfair, London
 Newgate Prison
 Newmarket Racecourse
 The Old Bailey
 Old Bond Street
 Opera House
 Pall Mall, London
 The Pantheon
 Ranelagh Gardens
 Regent's Park
 Regent Street
 Royal Circus
 Royal Opera House
 Royal Parks of London
 Rundell and Bridge Jewellery firm
 Savile Row
 St George's, Hanover Square
 St. James's
 Sydney Gardens, Bath
 Temple of Concord, St. James's Park
 Tattersalls
 The Thames Tunnel
 Tunbridge Wells
 Vauxhall Gardens
 West End of London
 Watier's
 White's

Notable people 

For more names see Newman (1997).

 Rudolph Ackermann
 Arthur Aikin
 Henry Addington, 1st Viscount Sidmouth
 William Arden, 2nd Baron Alvanley
 Elizabeth Armistead
 Jane Austen
 Charles Babbage
 Joseph Banks
 Richard Barry, 7th Earl of Barrymore
 William Blake
 Beau Brummell
 Mary Brunton
 Lord Frederick Beauclerk
 Henrietta Ponsonby, Countess of Bessborough
 Marguerite Gardiner, Countess of Blessington
 Bow Street Runners
 Caroline of Brunswick
 Frances Burney
 James Burton
 Decimus Burton
 Lord Byron
 George Campbell, 6th Duke of Argyll
 Robert Stewart, Viscount Castlereagh
 George Canning
 George Cayley
 Georgiana Cavendish, Duchess of Devonshire
 Princess Charlotte Augusta of Wales
 John Clare
 William Cobbett
 Samuel Taylor Coleridge
 Patrick Colquhoun
 John Constable
 Elizabeth Conyngham, Marchioness Conyngham
 Tom Cribb
 George Cruikshank
 John Dalton
 Humphry Davy
 John Disney
 David Douglas
 Maria Edgeworth
 Pierce Egan
 Thomas Bruce, 7th Earl of Elgin
 Grace Elliott
 Maria Fitzherbert
 Elizabeth Fry
 David Garrick
 George IV of the United Kingdom, Prince of Wales, Prince Regent then King
 James Gillray
 Frederick Robinson, 1st Viscount Goderich
 William Grenville, 1st Baron Grenville
 Charles Grey, 2nd Earl Grey
 Emma, Lady Hamilton
 William Harcourt, 3rd Earl Harcourt
 William Hazlitt
 William Hedley
 Leigh Hunt
 Isabella Ingram-Seymour-Conway, Marchioness of Hertford
 John Jackson
 Edward Jenner
 Sarah, Countess of Jersey
 Edmund Kean
 John Keats
 Lady Caroline Lamb
 Charles Lamb
 Emily Lamb, Countess Cowper
 Sir Thomas Lawrence, PRA
 Princess Lieven
 Mary Linwood
 Robert Jenkinson, 2nd Earl of Liverpool
 Ada Byron Lovelace
 John Loudon McAdam
 Lord Melbourne
 Hannah More
 John Nash
 Horatio Nelson, 1st Viscount Nelson
 George Ormerod
 Henry Paget, 1st Marquess of Anglesey
 Thomas Paine
 John Palmer, Royal Mail
 Sir Robert Peel
 Spencer Perceval
 William Pitt the Younger
 Jane Porter
 Hermann, Fürst von Pückler-Muskau
 Thomas De Quincey
 Thomas Raikes
 Humphry Repton
 Samuel Rogers
 Thomas Rowlandson
 James Sadler
 Walter Scott
 Richard "Conversation" Sharp
 Martin Archer Shee
 Percy Bysshe Shelley
 Mary Shelley
 Richard Brinsley Sheridan
 Sarah Siddons
 John Soane
 Adam Sedgwick
 Robert Stewart, Viscount Castlereagh
 John Wedgwood
 Arthur Wellesley, 1st Duke of Wellington
 Amelia Stewart, Viscountess Castlereagh
 Benjamin Thompson, Count Rumford
 Joseph Mallord William Turner
 Henry Vassall-Fox, 3rd Baron Holland
 Benjamin West
 William Wilberforce
 William Hyde Wollaston
 Mary Wollstonecraft
 William Wordsworth
 Jeffry Wyattville
 Thomas Young

Gallery

See also 

 Regency architecture
 Regency fashions
 Regency dance
 Régence, the period of the early 18th-century regency in France
 Society of Dilettanti
 Era of Good Feelings, for The United States

References

Sources 

 Bowman, Peter James. The Fortune Hunter: A German Prince in Regency England. Oxford: Signal Books, 2010.
 David, Saul. Prince of Pleasure The Prince of Wales and the Making of the Regency. New York: Atlantic Monthly Press, 1998.
 
 
 Knafla, David, Crime, punishment, and reform in Europe, Greenwood Publishing, 2003
 Lapp, Robert Keith. Contest for Cultural Authority – Hazlitt, Coleridge, and the Distresses of the Regency. Detroit: Wayne State UP, 1999.
 Marriott, J. A. R. England Since Waterloo (1913) online
 Morgan, Marjorie. Manners, Morals, and Class in England, 1774–1859. New York: St. Martin's Press, 1994.
 Morrison, Robert. The Regency Years: During Which Jane Austen Writes, Napoleon Fights, Byron Makes Love, and Britain Becomes Modern. 2019, New York: W. W. Norton, London: Atlantic Books online review
  online review; 904pp; 1121 short articles on Britain by 250 experts.
 Parissien, Steven. George IV Inspiration of the Regency. New York: St. Martin's P, 2001.
 Pilcher, Donald. The Regency Style: 1800–1830 (London: Batsford, 1947).
 Rendell, Jane. The pursuit of pleasure: gender, space & architecture in Regency London (Bloomsbury, 2002).
 Webb, R.K. Modern England: from the 18th century to the present (1968) online widely recommended university textbook
 Wellesley, Lord Gerald. "Regency Furniture", The Burlington Magazine for Connoisseurs 70, no. 410 (1937): 233–41.
 White, R.J. Life in Regency England (Batsford, 1963).

Crime and punishment 

 Emsley, Clive. Crime and society in England: 1750-1900 (2013).
 Innes, Joanna and John Styles. "The Crime Wave: Recent Writing on Crime and Criminal Justice in Eighteenth-Century England" Journal of British Studies 25#4 (1986), pp. 380–435 .
 Low, Donald A. The Regency Underworld. Gloucestershire: Sutton, 1999.
 Morgan, Gwenda, and Peter Rushton. Rogues, Thieves And the Rule of Law: The Problem of Law Enforcement in North-East England, 1718-1820 (2005).

Primary sources 

 Simond, Louis. Journal of a tour and residence in Great Britain, during the years 1810 and 1811 online

External links 

 Greenwood's Map of London, 1827
 Horwood Map of London, 1792 – 1799
 Results of the 1801 and 1811 Census of London, The European Magazine and London Review, 1818, p. 50
 The Bluestocking Archive
 End of an Era: 1815–1830
 New York Public Library, England – The Regency Style
 Regency Style Furniture

 

1810s in the United Kingdom
George III of the United Kingdom
George IV of the United Kingdom
History of the United Kingdom by period
Historical eras
Architecture of London
Regency (government)
1820 in the United Kingdom
1830s in the United Kingdom